Bohregh-e Bala (also Romanized as Bohregh-e Bālā; also known as Sarg Dār) is a village in Takht Rural District, Takht District, Bandar Abbas County, Hormozgan Province, Iran. At the 2006 census, its population was 257, in 54 families.

References 

Populated places in Bandar Abbas County